Hårup is a town in Aarhus Municipality, Central Denmark Region in Denmark with a population of 857 (1 January 2022). Hårup is situated north of the city of Aarhus between the towns Todbjerg and Mejlby in Todbjerg Parish close to Trige og Ølsted.

References

External links 
 Hårup School

Towns and settlements in Aarhus Municipality
Cities and towns in Aarhus Municipality